Lucas Foglia (born 1983) is an American photographer, living in San Francisco. "His work is concerned mainly with documenting people and their relationship to nature", for which he has travelled extensively making landscape photography and portraiture.

Foglia's Human Nature has been shown in solo exhibitions at the Museum of Contemporary Photography (MoCP) in Chicago and at Foam Fotografiemuseum Amsterdam. His work is held in the collections of Denver Art Museum, MoCP, Philadelphia Museum of Art and Portland Art Museum.

Early life and education
Foglia was born on Long Island, New York. His parents were part of the back-to-the-land movement and he grew up on their farm, 30 miles from Manhattan. He received his BA from Brown University in 2005  and received his MFA from Yale School of Art, at Yale University, Connecticut in 2010.

Work
Foglia's first two books A Natural Order (2012) and Frontcountry (2014) merge landscape photography and portraiture. According to Sean O'Hagan in The Guardian, the portraits in those books and in Human Nature (2017), "occupy that tricky, slightly heightened hinterland between documentary and staging."

A Natural Order "looked at people who lived off the grid in the American backwoods – drifters, Christian communities, back-to-the-land hippies, survivalists". It was made over five years and several long trips south in a camper van.

Frontcountry is a book of two halves, depicting the contrast between the contradictory lifestyles of ranching and mining in the contemporary American West. It was made between 2006 and 2013 in Idaho, Montana, Nevada, New Mexico, Texas and Wyoming.

Human Nature is "a series of vignettes about the relationship science, government, and individuals have with wilderness and nature."

Summer After (2021) contains black and white portraits of people that Foglia met on the street in New York City in 2002 in the wake of the September 11 attacks, after he moved to Manhattan.

Publications

Books by Foglia
A Natural Order. Portland, OR: Nazraeli, 2012. .
Frontcountry. Portland, OR: Nazraeli, 2014. .
Human Nature. Paso Robles, CA: Nazraeli, 2017. .
Summer After. UK: Stanley/Barker, 2021. .

Books with contributions by Foglia
Core Samples from the World. New York: New Directions, 2011. By Forrest Gander. . Poetry and essays by Gander, photographs by Foglia, Raymond Meeks, Graciela Iturbide.

Solo exhibitions
 2012. David Winton Bell Gallery of Brown University, Providence, Rhode Island. “A Natural Order” 
 2012. Les Rencontres d’Arles, Arles, France. “A Natural Order” 
 2012. Michael Hoppen Gallery, London, United Kingdom. “A Natural Order” 
 2013. Belfast Exposed, Belfast, Northern Ireland. “A Natural Order” 
 2013. Museum of Contemporary Art Denver, Denver, Colorado. “A Natural Order” 
 2013. Blue Sky Gallery, Portland, Oregon. “A Natural Order” 
 2013. Quinzaine Photographique Nantaise, Nantes, France. “A Natural Order” 
 2013. Athens Photo Festival, Athens, Greece. “A Natural Order” 
 2014. Fredericks & Freiser Gallery, New York, New York. “Frontcountry” 
 2014. Michael Hoppen Contemporary, London, United Kingdom. “Frontcountry” 
 2014. Robischon Gallery, Denver, Colorado. “Frontcountry” 
 2014. MiCamera, Milan, Italy. “Frontcountry” 
 2016. Jeonju International Photography Festival, Jeonju, South Korea. “A Natural Order” 
 2017. Michael Hoppen Contemporary, London, United Kingdom. “Human Nature” 
 2017. Fredericks & Freiser Gallery, New York, New York. “Human Nature” 
 2018. Foam Fotografiemuseum Amsterdam, Amsterdam, the Netherlands. “Human Nature” 
 2018. Headlands Center for the Arts, Sausalito, California. “Human Nature” 
 2018. Museum of Contemporary Photography, Chicago, Illinois. “Human Nature” 
 2021. Public Installation, Milan, Italy. “Human Nature” 
 2021. Photoclimat Biennale, Place du Palais Royal, Paris, France. “Human Nature”

Awards
2006. Rhode Island State Council on the Arts, Aaron Siskind Fellowship in Photography
2007. Light Work, Artist in Residence 
2008. Center for Photography at Woodstock, Photography Now 
2008. Magenta Foundation, Flash Forward 
2009. Photo District News, PDN 30 
2012. Paris Photo–Aperture Foundation PhotoBook Awards, Shortlist 
2014. Foam Talent 
2014. Individual Photographer’s Fellowship, Aaron Siskind Foundation 
2017. Syngenta Photography Award, Shortlist 
2018. Headlands Center for the Arts, Artist in Residence 
2019. Prix Pictet, Shortlist

Collections
Foglia's work is held in the following permanent collections:
 Deutsche Börse Photography Foundation, Frankfurt, Germany: 12 Prints (as of December 14, 2021) 
 Cantor Arts Center at Stanford University, Stanford, CA: 10 Prints (as of December 14, 2021) 
 Cleveland Museum of Art, Cleveland, OH: 7 Prints (as of December 14, 2021) 
 David Winton Bell Gallery of Brown University, Providence, RI: 88 Prints (as of December 14, 2021) 
 Denver Art Museum, Denver, CO: 13 Prints (as of December 14, 2021) 
 Harvard Art Museums, Cambridge, MA: 3 Prints (as of December 14, 2021) 
 International Center for Photography New York, NY: 42 Prints (as of December 14, 2021) 
 Light Work, Syracuse, NY: 7 Prints (as of December 14, 2021) 
 Los Angeles County Museum of Art, Los Angeles, CA: 14 Prints (as of December 14, 2021) 
 Milwaukee Art Museum, Milwaukee, WI: 10 Prints (as of December 14, 2021) 
Museum of Contemporary Photography, Chicago, Illinois: 53 prints (as of December 14, 2021) 
 Museum of Fine Arts Houston, Houston, TX: 7 Prints (as of December 14, 2021) 
Philadelphia Museum of Art, Philadelphia, Pennsylvania: 8 prints (as of December 14, 2021)
Portland Art Museum, Portland, Oregon: 10 prints (as of December 14, 2021)
 Rhode Island School of Design Museum, Providence, RI: 45 Prints (as of December 14, 2021) 
 San Francisco Museum of Modern Art, San Francisco, CA: 5 Prints (as of December 14, 2021) 
 Sheldon Museum of Art, Lincoln, NE: 6 Prints (as of December 14, 2021) 
 Comer Collection of Photography at University of Texas at Dallas, Dallas, TX: 6 Prints (as of December 14, 2021) 
 Victoria & Albert Museum, London, EN: 1 Print (as of December 14, 2021) 
Center for Photography at Woodstock, Woodstock, NY: 1 Print (as of December 14, 2021)

References

External links

Landscape photographers
American portrait photographers
Photographers from New York (state)
People from Long Island
Yale School of Art alumni
Living people
1983 births
Date of birth missing (living people)